Luc Leman (born 30 April 1953) is a Belgian former cyclist, who was professional from 1974 until 1979. He most notably won a stage of the 1975 Vuelta a España as well as the Nokere Koerse in 1976. He is the brother of cyclist Eric Leman.

Major results

1974
 2nd Overall Tour du Loir-et-Cher
 3rd Circuit de Wallonie
1975
 1st Stage 5 Vuelta a España
 5th Grote Prijs Jef Scherens
 6th Dwars door België
 10th Overall Tour Méditerranéen
1976
 1st Nokere Koerse
 3rd Amstel Gold Race
 3rd Omloop van Midden-Brabant
 4th Overall Étoile de Bessèges
1st Stages 3, 4 & 6
 5th Omloop Het Volk
 7th Dwars door België
 9th Overall Tour Méditerranéen
1977
 2nd Dwars door België
 6th E3 Harelbeke
1978
 1st Omloop van de Westhoek
 1st Stage 1 Tour Méditerranéen
1979
 1st Stage 2a Tour Méditerranéen

References

External links

1953 births
Living people
Belgian male cyclists
Belgian Vuelta a España stage winners
People from Ledegem
Cyclists from West Flanders